Hampus is a Swedish masculine given name which is the diminutive form of Hans. People with the name include:

Given name
 Hampus Wilhelm Arnell (1848–1932), Swedish bryologist
 Hampus Bergdahl (born 1995), Swedish footballer
 Hampus Eriksson (born 1996), Swedish ice hockey player
 Hampus Finndell (born 2000), Swedish football player
 Hampus Forsling (born 1994), Swedish ice hockey player
 Hampus Hellekant (born 1976), Swedish murderer 
 Hampus Jönsson (born 1991), Swedish football player
 Hampus Lindholm (born 1994), Swedish ice hockey player
 Hampus Nilsson (born 1990), Swedish football player
 Hampus Söderström (born 2000), Swedish football player
 Hampus Wanne (born 1993), Swedish handball player
 Hampus Zackrisson (born 1994), Swedish football player

Middle name
 Axel Hampus Dalström (1829–1882), Finnish architect
 Johan Hampus Furuhjelm (1821–1909), Swedish-speaking Finnish noble

References

Swedish masculine given names